The Mallorca Open Senior was a men's golf tournament on the European Senior Tour. In 2009 the tournament was called the Son Gual Mallorca Senior Open and was held at Son Gual Golf, Palma, Mallorca while in 2012 it was played at Pula Golf, Son Servera, Mallorca, Spain. In 2012 the prize fund was €200,000.

Winners

External links
Coverage on the European Senior Tour's official site

Former European Senior Tour events
Golf tournaments in Spain
Recurring sporting events established in 2009
Recurring sporting events established in 2012